Hohenbergia utriculosa is a plant species in the family Bromeliaceae. This species is native to Brazil.

References

utriculosa
Endemic flora of Brazil